Afrothismia pachyantha is a species of plant in the family Burmanniaceae. It is endemic to Cameroon. Its natural habitat is subtropical or tropical moist lowland evergreen forests  ca. 700 m alt. It is threatened by habitat loss. The species was first discovered in 1905 and rediscovered in 1995, making it a Lazarus taxon.

References

Sources
 

Burmanniaceae
Flora of Cameroon
Critically endangered plants
Taxonomy articles created by Polbot